Maury or Maurey is both a surname and a given name, often a short form (hypocorism) of Maurice. Notable people with the name include:

Surname
Abram Poindexter Maury (1801–1848), American politician and lawyer
Alain Maury (born 1958), French astronomer
Antonia Maury (1866–1952), American astronomer, sister of Carlotta Maury
Bernard Maurey (born 1948), French mathematician
Carlotta Maury (1874–1938), American geologist and paleontologist, sister of Antonia Maury
Cornelia F. Maury (1866–1942), American painter
Dabney H. Maury (1822–1900), Confederate major general and United States Ambassador to Colombia
Hervé Maurey (born 1961), French politician
James Maury (1717–1769), American educator and cleric, father of James Maury (1746–1840) and grandfather of Matthew Fontaine Maury
James Maury (consul) (1746–1840), one of the first diplomats of the United States
Jean-Sifrein Maury (1746–1817), French cardinal and Archbishop of Paris
John Walker Maury (1809–1855), lawyer and 14th mayor of Washington, D.C.
Louis Ferdinand Alfred Maury (1817–1892), French scholar
Matthew Fontaine Maury (1806–1873), American naval officer, oceanographer, cartographer and author
Max Maurey (1866–1947), French playwright
Nicole Maurey (1925–2016), French actress
Pierre Maury (1282 or 1283–after 1324), French shepherd converted from Catholicism to Albigensianism
Richard Maury (1882–1950), American engineer best known for his railroad work in Argentina
Robert Maury (born 1958), American serial killer
Serge Maury (born 1946), French sailor and 1972 Olympic champion in the Finn class
Sarah Mytton Maury (1801–1849), English author, grandmother of Carlotta and Antonia Maury
William Arden Maury (1832–1918), U.S. Assistant Attorney General, son of John Walker Maury
William Lewis Maury (1813–1878), American naval officer
Rafael Santos Borré Maury (born 1995), professional footballer

Given name
Maury Allen (1932–2010), American sportswriter
Maury Bray (1909–1966), American football player
Maury Buford (born 1960), retired National Football League punter
Maury Chaykin (1949–2010), Canadian-American actor
Maury M. Cohen, American filmmaker
Maury Deutsch (1918–2007), American musician, arranger-composer and teacher
Maury Laws (born 1923), American television and film score composer
Maury Maverick (1895–1954), American politician and coiner of the term "gobbledygook"
Maury Nipp (born 1930), American football player
Maury Povich (born 1939), American journalist and talk show host
Maury Tigner (born 1937), American physicist
Maury Wills (1932–2022), retired Major League Baseball player

See also
Maurie, a given name
Morrie, a given name
Morey (disambiguation), includes list of people with surname Morey
Morrey, surname
Murry (disambiguation), includes list of people with given name and surname Murry

References

Masculine given names
Hypocorisms